In a broad sense, a welder is anyone, amateur or professional, who uses welding equipment, perhaps especially one who uses such equipment fairly often. In a narrower sense, a welder is a tradesperson who specializes in fusing materials together. The term welder refers to the operator, the machine is referred to as the welding power supply. The materials to be joined can be metals (such as steel, aluminum, brass, stainless steel etc.) or varieties of plastic or polymer. Welders typically have to have good dexterity and attention to detail, as well as technical knowledge about the materials being joined and best practices in the field.

Safety issues
Welding, without the proper precautions appropriate for the process, can be a dangerous and unhealthy practice. However, with the use of new technology and proper protection, the risks of injury and death associated with welding can be greatly reduced. Because many common welding procedures involve an open electric arc or a flame, the risk of burns is significant. To prevent them, welders wear personal protective equipment in the form of heavy leather gloves and protective long sleeve jackets to avoid exposure to extreme heat and flames. Additionally, the brightness of the weld area leads to a condition called arc eye in which ultraviolet light causes the inflammation of the cornea and can burn the retinas of the eyes. Full face welding helmets with dark face plates are worn to prevent this exposure, and in recent years, new helmet models have been produced that feature a faceplate that self-darkens upon exposure to high amounts of UV light. To protect bystanders, opaque welding curtains often surround the welding area. These curtains, made of a polyvinyl chloride plastic film, shield nearby workers from exposure to the UV light from the electric arc, but should not be used to replace the filter glass used in helmets.<ref name="Cary">Cary, Howard B. and Scott C. Helzer (2005). Modern Welding Technology. Upper Saddle River, New Jersey: Pearson Education.  .</ref>

Welders are also often exposed to dangerous gases and particulate matter.  Processes like flux-cored arc welding and shielded metal arc welding produce smoke containing particles of various types of oxides, which in some cases can lead to medical conditions like metal fume fever. The size of the particles in question tends to influence the toxicity of the fumes, with smaller particles presenting a greater danger. Additionally, many processes produce fumes and various gases, most commonly carbon dioxide and ozone, that can prove dangerous if ventilation is inadequate. Furthermore, because the use of compressed gases and flames in many welding processes pose an explosion and fire risk, some common precautions include limiting the amount of oxygen in the air and keeping combustible materials away from the workplace. Welders with expertise in welding pressurized vessels, including submarine hulls, industrial boilers, and power plant heat exchangers and boilers, are generally referred to as boilermakers.

A lot of welders relate to getting small electrical shocks from their equipment. Occasionally, welders might work in damp crowded environments and they consider it to be a "part of the job." Welders can be shocked by faulty conditions in the welding circuit, or, from the work lead clamp, a grounded power tool that is on the bench (the workpiece or the electrode). All of these types of shocks come from the welding electrode terminal. Often these shocks are minor and are misdiagnosed as being an issue with a power tool or the power supply to the welder’s area. However, the more likely cause is from stray welding current which occurs when current from the welding cables leaks into the welder’s work area. Often this is not a serious problem, however, under the right circumstances, this can be fatal to the welder or anyone else inside the work area. When a welder feels a shock, they should take a minute to inspect the welding cables and ensure that they are clean and dry, and, that there are no cracks or gouges out of the rubber casing around the wire. These precautions may be life-saving to the welders.

 Industries That Need Welders 
There is a growing demand for qualified welders in several areas, including one in particular. The average age of welders in most regions is 59, which suggests that many will soon retire. Training conscientious and highly qualified welders is therefore essential to addressing the future shortfall. Welders are needed in many industries, like nuclear industries, metal fabrication, and construction, now and in the future, making welding a desirable career path.

Notable welders

Notable people who have worked as welders include:
İshak Alaton, Turkish businessman and investor
Steve Baer, passive-solar-energy designer/manufacturer, and author
Lucian Boz, Romanian literary critic, essayist, novelist, poet and translator
Bevan Braithwaite, chief executive of The Welding Institute
Hardcore Holly, American semi-retired professional wrestler
Mark Honadel, American businessman, former professional metal fabricator, welding instructor, industrial manager and politician 
William A. Schmidt, American welder, shop foreman and politician
Stefan Löfven, Prime Minister of Sweden
Werner Herzog, German film director
Honoré Sharrer, American painter
Mohammad Abbas (cricketer), Pakistani cricketer
Jesse James (entrepreneur) West Coast Choppers custom vehicle maker and American television personality
Jessi Combs Host of Overhaulin', American professional racer, television personality, and metal fabricator.
Paul Teutul Sr. Founder of Orange County Choppers, Custom Motorcycle Manufacturing
Paul Teutul Jr. Co-Owner of Orange County Choppers, Custom Motorcycle Manufacturing
Billy Connolly Scottish Stand-up Comedian, Actor, Welded at a Shipyard in his youth.
Nyu Kok Meng, a Malaysian who formerly worked as a welder in Singapore prior to becoming an armed robber in the high-profile 1983 Andrew Road triple murders. He was currently released since 2005 after serving a life sentence and receiving 6 strokes of the cane for armed robbery.
Marvin Heemeyer, perpetrator of the Granby Rampage, in which he built and operated an armoured Komatsu D355A bulldozer dubbed "The Killdozer".

See also
 
 

References

Further reading

ASM International (2003).  Trends in Welding Research.  Materials Park, Ohio: ASM International.  
Hicks, John (1999).  Welded Joint Design.  New York: Industrial Press. .
Kalpakjian, Serope and Steven R. Schmid (2001).  Manufacturing Engineering and Technology''. Prentice Hall.  .

Construction trades workers
Metalworking occupations
Production occupations